Erianthus is a generic name that may refer to:
 Erianthus (insect), a genus of grasshoppers in the family Chorotypidae
 Erianthus, an old name for a genus of grass, now considered a synonym of the genus Saccharum